Cerro Tres Picos is the highest point of the Sierra de la Ventana mountain range in the province of Buenos Aires. As such, it is also the highest point in Buenos Aires province, as well as in the pampas region.

Geography

Location
The mountain is 650 km southwest of the city of Buenos Aires; the closest settlement is Villa Ventana in the Tornquist Partido.

It is located on private property owned by the Fundación Funke (Funke Foundation), a charitable organization that maintains the land donated by German immigrant Rodolfo Funke after his death in 1938.

Climate
The mountain has a dry climate. Summers are warm, with temperatures above 30 °C during the day. Winters have an average high of 8 °C and are somewhat rainier, with nights frequently below freezing.

References

External links
 Fundación Funke

Mountains of Argentina
Landforms of Buenos Aires Province